The music for the 2018 action-adventure game Red Dead Redemption 2, developed and published by Rockstar Games, consists of an original score composed by musician Woody Jackson and an original soundtrack produced by Daniel Lanois. The soundtrack album was released digitally in July 2019, consisting of vocal tracks with artists such as Willie Nelson, Rhiannon Giddens, and Josh Homme. The score album was released in August 2019, mostly consisting of Jackson's original work and collaborations with artists such as Colin Stetson, Senyawa, and Arca. An additional extended play, The Housebuilding EP, was released in February 2021, consisting of original songs by David Ferguson and Matt Sweeney. Two singles of music from the game have also been released: "Unshaken" by D'Angelo in January 2019, later released as part of the original soundtrack; and "Letter from Bluewater Man" by Christone "Kingfish" Ingram in August 2021, as part of an update for Red Dead Online.

Red Dead Redemption 2 has three different types of score: narrative, which is heard during the missions in the game's story; interactive, when the player is roaming the open world or in multiplayer; and environmental, which includes campfire singing songs or a character playing music in the world. The game's music regularly reacts according to the player's decisions in the world. Jackson composed roughly 60 hours of music for the game, though not every track made the final product. He purchased several instruments from the Wrecking Crew that were featured on classic cowboy films. Lanois was chosen to produce all of the game's vocal tracks for consistency and to complement Jackson's score. In total, over 110 musicians worked on the music for the game.

Critical reception to the soundtracks was positive, as reviewers felt that the music connected appropriately with the gameplay. In particular, critics felt that the minimalist approach of the score's composition matched the gameplay, genre, and time, and the vocal tracks were praised for their impactfulness. The game's music was nominated for numerous awards. Several tracks became popular and spawned cover versions and live performances.

Production and composition

Instrumental score 

Woody Jackson, who worked with developer and publisher Rockstar Games on Red Dead Redemption (2010) and Grand Theft Auto V (2013), returned to compose Red Dead Redemption 2s original score. Discussions about the game's music began early in development, as the team felt that it helped to create atmosphere and tone. Jackson composed roughly 60 hours of music for the game, but not every track made the final product; the game has 192 interactive mission tracks. Ivan Pavlovich, director of music and audio, estimated that the player would only hear around one-third of the total music created for the game in a standard playthrough. Red Dead Redemption 2 has three different types of score: narrative, which is heard during the missions in the game's story; interactive, when the player is roaming the open world or in multiplayer; and environmental, which includes campfire singing songs or a character playing music in the world. The game's music regularly reacts according to the player's decisions in the world, matching the game's atmosphere and the player's choices.

Jackson compared the beginning of the scoring process to that of a film, as he worked with the game's linear cutscenes. As the process progressed, it became less like a film; he would record 11 stem loops of around 4–5 minutes, which change in the game based on the changing of emotions. This change is initiated in the game's engine by an artificial intelligence system internally named the "Gunfight Conductor", which alters and creates additional sounds for variation. This system was introduced in Rockstar's previous game, Grand Theft Auto V, but received an overhaul for Red Dead Redemption 2; it is similarly used in the game's multiplayer counterpart, Red Dead Online. Jackson's goal with the ambient music was for it to accompany the game's sound design and not become distracting for the player. Comparing the game to a television season, Jackson considered a mission to be like an episode, as it tells an individual story arc while maintaining the same themes across multiple missions. For the narrative music, Jackson maintained the same tempo and key to avoid any clutter. At one point during development, he used around 15 stems, but ultimately brought it back to around six.

To ensure that his music was effective for the game, Jackson listened to the music while shooting at a target range using a gun from the game's time. He also purchased several instruments from the Wrecking Crew that were featured on classic cowboy films, such as Dennis Budimir's 1898 Martin 1–28 gut string and Tommy Tedesco's Harmina Salinas Hijas gut string. He also acquired a 1920s Gibson Mandobass used on Bullitt (1968) that recreated an "ominous" bell sound, ukuleles from Butch Cassidy and the Sundance Kid (1969), and a nylon guitar used on Unforgiven (1992). During recording, Jackson played cues to each musician using call and response, to which they would respond organically, either copying Jackson's cue or playing how they feel. This system took place over a few days, and the tracks make up most of the open-world music. Several recording tools were used to capture the music, dating from a 1959 8-track tape to the modern digital workstation Pro Tools. When creating the score, Jackson gathered musician friends like bassist Mike Watt, violinist Petra Haden, and drummer Jon Theodore for jam sessions, often using Jackson's old instruments.

While the first game imitated popular Spaghetti Western film soundtracks, the second game aimed to become more unique. Jackson estimated that he changed the music about four times throughout development, from extreme experimentation to classic Western sounds, ultimately blending to make "something different". Pavlovich felt that in order to find an effective result, they had to "push it almost until you break it, and then you swing back". To avoid imitating the bell used in Spaghetti Western soundtracks, Jackson instead used a mandolin used by the Wrecking Crew. The music team found reference points in Willie Nelson's album Teatro (1998) and the soundtrack for the 1971 film The Hired Hand. While researching for the game's score, Jackson found that Ennio Morricone's work—particularly on Sergio Leone's Dollars Trilogy (1964–1966)—was already a departure from typical Western music of the time, instead featuring sounds popular at the time such as "psychedelic guitars, lots of noises", so Jackson felt that he could also take such creative liberties with Red Dead Redemption 2. Similarly, he was even more influenced by Masaru Sato's score on Akira Kurosawa's film Yojimbo (1961), which he felt focused on emotion rather than trying to replicate the sound of feudal Japan, the film's setting.

Guitarist Matt Sweeney was first approached to work on the game while intoxicated at Max Fish Bar in New York in around 2016 or 2017 by Rockstar's music supervisor Tony Mesones. He was asked to create "Appalachian sounding music" for the game's smaller, character-focused missions. When Sweeney discovered the game's setting, he recommended that Rockstar engage David R. Ferguson to create music with him due to Ferguson's extensive experience with hillbilly music. Pavlovich and Mesones visited Sweeney and Ferguson at the Butcher Shoppe Recording Studio in Nashville to show them videos of the game and discuss the characters. Ferguson recalled that Rockstar wanted to avoid blues music in the game. He noted the differences between his typical work and his work on the game, noting that he avoided percussion so players would not confuse it with in-game sound effects. Ferguson provided Rockstar with traditional instruments; one of his colleagues, Leroy Troy, possesses a "percussion rig with bells and whistles" that was used for one of the songs, "A Quiet Time". Sweeney took inspiration from segments of other music—such as the insistent drums in the work of Morricone—without being derivative; he was partly inspired by Bruce Langhorne's work on the soundtrack for The Hired Hand (1971). Sweeney and Ferguson estimated that they created around 100 small pieces of music for the game.

In total, over 110 musicians worked on the music for the game. Sweeney noted that several musicians turned down offers to work on the soundtrack, due to their unfamiliarity with the industry and technology. Pavlovich felt that the diversity of the game's landscapes allowed for more diverse sounds, engaging saxophone player Colin Stetson, experimental band Senyawa, and musician Arca to work on the score. While Pavlovich felt that Arca's work was "too angular or sharp or modern sounding", he found techniques to subtly add it to the game to separate it from the Spaghetti Western sounds. For the arrangement of the traditional songs in the game, Rockstar engaged historic music producer Eli Smith, who fit the songs to the game and worked with the actors to perform them.

Vocal tracks 

Pavlovich engaged Daniel Lanois to produce all of the game's original vocal tracks, wanting a consistent "through-line" to complement Jackson's score. Lanois collaborated with artists such as D'Angelo, Willie Nelson, Rhiannon Giddens, and Josh Homme. Lanois wrote the song "Cruel World", especially for Nelson. When a hurricane prevented Nelson from recording the song, the team sent the track to Homme in the hopes that he could record it in time for the game's release; Homme recorded his vocals in an Australian studio while on tour. Nelson was ultimately able to record the song in time in Los Angeles; the team considered combining both versions into a duet, but ultimately included both versions in the game.

D'Angelo had played the game at Rockstar's offices in New York City before agreeing to work on the game; his apparent enthusiasm in the title prompted Pavlovich to invite him to work on music. Pavlovich felt that D'Angelo's involvement in the game led to Lanois's engagement with the project. Lanois's co-writer Rocco DeLuca conceived the chant for the songs "Unshaken" and "Crash of Worlds" in New Orleans, based on a proverb by Paramahansa Yogananda: "You must stand unshaken amidst the crash of breaking worlds". Lanois felt that the term applied to the determination of game's characters throughout the story.

Lanois took an early version of the song to D'Angelo in New York; they added a percussion track with Brian Blade on drums and Cyril Neville on cowbell, while Lanois played guitar and D'Angelo played Rhodes piano, and turned it into a full song. The recording process with D'Angelo took around a week and a half. Lanois and D'Angelo originally began working on a rock-oriented song in a  time signature, but "it didn't pan out". Nas also recorded a version of "Unshaken" with rap verses.

Lanois felt that the darker tones of "Love Come Back" resonated well with the game, despite only featuring musical instruments that did not exist in the game's time; he also recorded an acoustic version with more accurate instruments. "That's the Way It Is" was written with the theme of acceptance and surrender, which Lanois felt resonated with protagonist Arthur Morgan's stillness towards the game's conclusion as he is questioning life.

Albums

Original Soundtrack 

The Music of Red Dead Redemption 2 (Original Soundtrack) comprises the original songs created for Red Dead Redemption 2. Produced by Daniel Lanois, the soundtrack includes songs from D'Angelo, Willie Nelson, Rhiannon Giddens, and Josh Homme. The album was released by Lakeshore Records and Rockstar Games digitally on July 12, 2019, and as a CD and vinyl record on September 20, 2019. Rockstar announced the album's title and track listing on June 14, 2019, when pre-orders became available. Pre-orders granted immediate access to two singles from the soundtrack: "Crash of Worlds" and "Table Top". An additional song by David Ferguson was originally due for inclusion on the album.

The soundtrack was positively received. Graham Banas of Push Square wrote that the vocal tracks "create relaxing, melancholic moments". In the context of the game, Dave Thier of Forbes praised the tracks for having as powerful an impact as in Red Dead Redemption. Game Informers Jason Guisao found that "Mountain Hymn" echoes the "transience of life and innocence in [the game's] violent American frontier"; Push Squares Banas similarly praised the track, describing it as "one of the most beautiful melodies ever created". The soundtrack album peaked at 45 on the Billboard Top Album Sales, 21 on the Soundtracks charts, 15 on Vinyl Albums, 12 on Independent Albums, and 11 on Digital Albums. At the Hollywood Music in Media Awards, the soundtrack won Best Soundtrack Album and "That's the Way It Is" was nominated for Original Song in a Video Game.

The vinyl release of the album, produced by Tony Giles, split it into four sides across two records.

Original Score 

The Music of Red Dead Redemption 2 (Original Score) comprises the original score created for Red Dead Redemption 2 by Woody Jackson. It was recorded at Jackson's Electro-Vox Recording Studios in Los Angeles and mastered at DNA Mastering in Glendale, California. The soundtrack features additional production and arrangement by Jeff Silverman, and musical score and orchestration by Colin Stetson, David Ferguson, David Ralicke, Gabe Witcher, Luke O'Malley, Mario Batkovic, Matt Sweeney, Rabih Beaini, and Senyawa. Over 110 other musicians also contributed to the tracks, including Arca, Duane Eddy, Jon Theodore, and Michael Shuman.

Pre-orders for the album became available on July 19, 2019, following Rockstar's announcement of the album's title and track listing. Pre-orders granted immediate access to three singles from the soundtrack: "Outlaws From the West", "Fleeting Joy", and "Country Pursuits". The album was released by Lakeshore Records and Rockstar Games digitally on August 9, 2019. CD and vinyl record versions of the album were released on Record Store Day on April 10, 2020, in a collaboration between Rockstar, Lakeshore, and Invada Records. Michael Walters of TheGamer praised the progression of the soundtrack's track listing, finding it representative of the game's narrative experience; he named "Revenge is a Dish Best Eaten" the strongest track, lauding the growing tension and eventual clash of the horn and strings, comparing them to the characters Dutch van der Linde and Angelo Bronte, respectively.

In the context of the game, Jackson's musical score was described as "top notch" by IGNs Luke Reilly, who described it as "an evocative mix of jangling Ennio Morricone-esque guitar and more soulful pieces"; Push Squares Banas wrote that it adds "a sense of tension and action that you can only get from a western". GamesRadar+s David Meikleham wrote that the score is "both electrifying and eclectic". Dean Takahashi of VentureBeat felt that the soundtrack contributed significantly to the game's immersion, while Matt Bertz of Game Informer noted that the soundtrack added authenticity to the game world by using elements of American folk music. VG247s Kirk McKeand praised the blending of music during exploration and its intensity in combat, and lauded the sparing use of vocal tracks to highlight important narrative moments. Game Informers Guisao wrote that he preferred the "couplet" of the songs "American Venom" and "American Reprise" over the game's vocal tracks.

The vinyl release of the album, produced by Giles, reordered the track listing and split two of the songs into two parts, increasing the track numbering from 22 to 24.

The Housebuilding EP 

The Music of Red Dead Redemption 2: The Housebuilding EP comprises the original songs created for Red Dead Redemption 2 by David Ferguson and Matt Sweeney. The album was released by Lakeshore Records and Rockstar Games digitally and as a vinyl record on February 12, 2021. Produced by Ferguson and Sweeney, the album was recorded at the Butcher Shoppe Recording Studio in Nashville and engineered by Sean Sullivan. It was mastered at DNA Mastering in Glendale, California. Ben Bryson of mxdwn praised the songs for "painting pictures through music without lyrics", noting that album is "less about the music and more about how the music functions".

The vinyl release of the album, produced by Giles, split it into two sides across one record.

Singles

"Unshaken" 

"Unshaken" is a song by D'Angelo. It was produced by Lanois, who wrote the track with D'Angelo and DeLuca, The song was released digitally as an individual single by RCA Records on January 4, 2019, prior to its release as part of the Original Soundtrack in July 2019. It was D'Angelo's first piece of new music released since his third studio album, Black Messiah, in December 2014. D'Angelo sings in his lower vocal register on the track, a deliberate choice by Pavlovich to differentiate it from his typical falsetto singing voice.

The song received praise: Esquires Dom Nero described its performance in the game as "a sublime narrative moment that's among the best gaming has ever offered", and Amanda Hurych of AXS considered it "a perfect complement" to the game's narrative. Atwood Magazines Ilana Kalish praised the combination of musical elements, particularly the lyrics and percussion. Game Informers Jason Guisao identified that "Unshaken" was the game's most popular song. The track peaked at number six on the US R&B Digital Song Sales.

"Letter From Bluewater Man" 

"Letter from Bluewater Man" is a blues song performed by Christone "Kingfish" Ingram, who wrote and produced the track with Carl Lois. The song was created for Blood Money, an update for Red Dead Online released on July 13, 2021; in the game, Ingram plays "Bluewater" John, a guitar player based on Robert Johnson. Ingram wanted to "capture the essence" of Johnson in the song. He wanted to avoid the traditional I–IV–IV chord progression, seeking an eight-bar blues progression instead; he wanted a "type of groove" like the blues standard song "Key to the Highway".

The song was released as a digital single on August 20, 2021. Andrea Domanick of KCRW found that the song "stands on its own", praising its "sparse arrangement, lilting guitar, and soul-punch vocals". Upon hearing the song used in the game's trailer, Sam Roche of Guitar World wrote that Ingram delivers "his instantly recognizable soulful vocals over a series of silky blue fingerstyle lines".

Legacy 
Red Dead Redemption 2 won Best Score/Music at The Game Awards 2018, Best Video Game Music at IGNs Best of 2018 Awards, and Best Music from Giant Bomb. It was also nominated for the Tin Pan Alley Award for Best Music in a Game at the 8th New York Game Awards, and Excellence in Musical Score at the 6th SXSW Gaming Awards. Banas of Push Square ranked the game's music as the best PlayStation game of 2018, and the third-best of the 2010s, writing that it "raised the bar on what a soundtrack could accomplish". GamingBolts Shubhankar Parijat considered it the best game music of the year, writing that it "enhance[s]s the core essence of [the] game's DNA in every way possible ... better than most soundtracks we've seen in a game".

Lanois and his band Heavy Sun performed several songs from the game alongside Giddens at The Game Awards on December 6, 2018. Jackson led an hour-long live performance of the game's soundtrack at the Red Bull Music Festival in Los Angeles on February 23, 2019. Lanois performed music from the game's soundtrack with his band at Amoeba Music on September 19, 2019. In September 2019, as part of its Amazon Originals series, Amazon Music engaged Giddens to record a cover of "Cruel World", while Lanois and his band Heavy Sun covered "That's the Way It Is". In February and March 2021, to celebrate the release of The Housebuilding EP, Lakeshore Records released live performances of all five tracks by Ferguson, Sweeney, and Tim O'Brien, recorded at the Butcher Shoppe. Lanois, D'Angelo, and Giddens performed music from the game at the Battery in New York during the Tribeca Film Festival on June 10, 2021, to celebrate the inaugural Tribeca Games Award as well as the tenth anniversary of the festival's recognition of Rockstar's L.A. Noire (2011); this marked D'Angelo's first live appearance performing songs from the game.

References

External links 
 
 

2019 soundtrack albums
Albums recorded at Electro-Vox Recording Studios
Red Dead Redemption 2
Red Dead Redemption 2
Red Dead Redemption 2